James Hepburn (died 1524) was a Scottish prelate and administrator. He was the son of Alexander Hepburn of Whitsome. His name occurs as the rector of Dalry and king's clerk on 1 August 1511. Hepburn was Treasurer of Scotland between from at least June 1515, until October the following year. He also held the position of rector of Parton in the diocese of Galloway.

He was elected Bishop of Moray sometime before 12 February 1516, on the nomination of the Governor of Scotland, John Stewart, Duke of Albany, following the translation of Bishop Andrew Forman to the Archbishopric of St Andrews.

Hepburn had been granted the temporalities of the see by 28 August. With his provision by Pope Leo X on 14 May 1516, he received a Bull exempting him from the metropolitan and legatine jurisdiction of the Archbishop of St Andrews. Although Archbishop Forman (d. 1521) had consented to this, his successor James Beaton resented it, and wrote to a senior Cardinal as a part of a wider attempt to have this reversed.

Among other activities as during his short episcopate, Hepburn instituted the church of Duffus as a new rectory. He died shortly before 11 November 1524.

Notes

References
Dowden, John, The Bishops of Scotland, ed. J. Maitland Thomson, (Glasgow, 1912)
Keith, Robert, An Historical Catalogue of the Scottish Bishops: Down to the Year 1688, (London, 1924)
Watt, D.E.R., Fasti Ecclesiae Scoticanae Medii Aevi ad annum 1638, 2nd Draft, (St Andrews, 1969)

15th-century births
1524 deaths
Bishops of Moray
People from Berwickshire
16th-century Scottish Roman Catholic bishops
Treasurers of Scotland